The 2014 International Gymnix competition was a competition held in  Montreal, Canada in early March 2014 (from March 6 to March 9). It was the 23rd edition of the International Gymnix. The nations that had placed in the top 16 places in the 2011 World Artistic Gymnastics Championships were invited to the tournament, with Belgium, Italy, Romania and Russia joining it. The Junior International Cup was open to athletes born between 1999 and 2001. Russia won the team event. Kirsten Peterman placed third on vault after her 2013 win, while Angelina Melnikova won her first international medal, placing second on all-around in the Junior Cup.

Medal winners

Senior International Cup

Junior International Cup

Results

Senior Cup

All-around

Vault

Uneven bars

Balance beam

Floor exercise

Junior Cup

Team Final

All-around

Vault

Uneven Bars

Balance beam

Floor exercise

References

External links
  Official site

International Gymnix
2014 in Canadian sports
2014 in Quebec